Donald Alfred Gurnett (April 11, 1940 – January 13, 2022) was an American physicist and professor at the University of Iowa who specialized in plasma physics.

Early life and education
Gurnett grew up in Fairfax, Iowa. In his spare time he built and flew model airplanes with a club at the airport in Cedar Rapids. There he met the German expatriate scientist Alexander Lippisch.

Gurnett received his bachelor's degree in electrical engineering from the University of Iowa in 1962, and then his master's degree in physics in 1963 and his doctorate in 1965.

Career
Gurnett's research into space plasmas (and his involvement in the development of electronics and measuring devices for space missions) began while he was a student and eventually led to early studies of plasma waves in the Earth's radiation belt (via low-frequency radio waves). From 1962, he was a NASA trainee at the University of Iowa and Stanford University (1964/65). He participated to the Injun satellites program designed and built by researchers at the University of Iowa to observe various radiation and magnetic phenomena in the ionosphere and beyond.  In 1965, he became an assistant professor, in 1968 an associate professor, and in 1972 a professor at the University of Iowa.

His involvement with space plasmas continued through his involvement in 41 NASA missions, including Voyager 1 and Voyager 2 to the outer planets, the Galileo mission to Jupiter, and the Cassini mission to Saturn. He was particularly concerned with the formation of the plasma waves observable in the radio spectrum in the plasmas of the radiation belts of planets with magnetic fields and wave-particle interactions in the plasmas, which are often easier to study in space than in the laboratory.

In late August 2012, the radio and plasma-wave instrument designed by Gurnett onboard Voyager 1 confirmed that it had crossed the heliopause.

Personal life 
He was married to his wife Marie. Together they had two daughters, Suzanne and Christina.

Gurnett died on January 13, 2022, at the age of 81.

Awards and honors
In 1998, Gurnett became a member of the National Academy of Sciences. In 2004, he became a member of the American Academy of Arts and Sciences.

In 2014 he gave the Van Vleck Lecture and in 2006 the EGU Hannes Alfvén Medal. In addition, he received the Humboldt Prize, with which he was at the Max Planck Institute for Extraterrestrial Physics in Garching (1975/76). In 1989 he received the John Adam Fleming Medal from the American Geophysical Union and the Excellence in Plasma Physics Award from the APS and in 1978 the John Howard Dellinger Gold Medal from the International Union of Radio Science. In 1979/80 he was a visiting professor at UCLA.

External links

References

1940 births
2022 deaths
Members of the United States National Academy of Sciences
University of Iowa faculty
University of Iowa alumni
People from Linn County, Iowa
Scientists from Iowa
20th-century American physicists
Fellows of the American Academy of Arts and Sciences